Rauheneck refers to the following castles in Europe:

 Rauheneck Castle (Ebern) near Ebern in Bavaria, Germany
 Rauheneck Castle (Baden) near Baden (near Vienna) in Lower Austria